The noble title of Marquis de Arronches was created on 27 April 1674 by D. Afonso VI of Portugal for Henrique de Sousa Tavares, 3º conde de Miranda do Corvo. The heir presumptive to the title is the only male descendant of the family,  D. Pedro Miguel Vasques Milhinhos, who due to primogeniture will be the only one eligible to succeed D. Aires Manuel to the title.

History
Following the departure of several nobles and members of the Portuguese court to Spain, lands and goods from northern Portugal to the Alentejo regions were left behind. Among those forced to flee to Spain was D. Henrique de Sousa Tavares, a count. There, he performed favours for the king, also providing support for several noblemen. In recognition of these services and to ensure continuation of the Portuguese nobility the titles of Duke de Lafões and Marquis de Arronches were created.

Following the death of  D. João Carlos de Bragança e Ligne de Sousa Tavares Mascarenhas da Silva (1719-1806), 2º Duke de Lafões e 8º Count de Miranda do Corvo, his eccentric, hedonistic life and his spending habits led to sale of most of the family's properties and goods. Following payment of family debts, the title fell into disuse due to stigma associated with it, as well as the creation of the Portuguese Republic which ended legal recognition of titles of nobility.

Recent usage
Following an extensive review of the history of the Miranda/Tavares clan by the family the title has been brought back into usage by the present holder, D. Aires Manuel Tavares Marques, 10º Marquis de Arronches, as well as his mother, Dowager Countess Isabel Miranda. Aires is a senior civil servant at the Ministry of Defence, following in the footsteps of his father, a former commander in the Portuguese Air Force who died in an airplane crash during his son's youth. Although the title has not been formally recognised by the Duke of Braganza, due to dispute over the Dukes' authority to do so, the title has been used informally by the family for certain purposes.

The direct heir to the title (as D. Aires has two daughters but no sons) is found in D. Paulo Augusto Tavares Milhinhos, Visconde de Miranda de Corvo, who is a first cousin of D.Aires. He has made it known that he intends to cede his right to this title in favour of his only son, D. Pedro Miguel Vasques Milhinhos, therefore making him D.Aires' direct successor.

Born in May 1996, D. Pedro Miguel is the first heir presumptive to the Marquis de Arronches and the Count de Miranda de Corvo titles who does not have Miranda or Tavares in his surname (both of which are the original names of the family). Following completion of his studies in Portugal and at Harrow School in London, D. Pedro Miguel has undertaken study at the University of Leeds and the London School of Economics in the United Kingdom.

Successors
Title holders/heirs
 D. Henrique de Sousa Tavares (1626-1706), 3º conde de Miranda do Corvo e 28º senhor da Casa de Sousa
 Dona Mariana Luisa Francisca de Sousa Tavares Mascarenhas e Silva (1672-1743), 5ª condessa de Miranda do Corvo e 29ª senhora da Casa de Sousa;
 D. Pedro Henrique de Bragança (1718-1743), 1º duque de Lafões e 7ª conde de Miranda do Corvo; 
 D. João Carlos de Bragança e Ligne de Sousa Tavares Mascarenhas da Silva (1719-1806), 2º duque de Lafões e 8º conde de Miranda do Corvo
 Dona Ana Maria de Bragança e Ligne de Sousa Tavares Mascarenhas da Silva (1797-1851), 3ª duquesa de Lafões e 9ª condessa de Miranda do Corvo
 Dona Maria Carlota de Bragança e Ligne de Sousa Tavares Mascarenhas da Silva (1820-1865), 34ª senhora da Casa de Sousa
 Dona Isabel Miranda Tavares, 12ª Condessa Víuva de Miranda de Corvo, (1929- present)
 D. Aires Manuel Tavares Marques, 10º Marquês de Arroches, 13º Conde de Miranda de Corvo, (1963- present)
 Married to Isabel Marques, 10º Marquesa de Arroches, 13º Condessa de Miranda de Corvo with whom he has two daughters.
 D. Paulo Augusto Tavares Milhinhos, Visconde de Miranda de Corvo (1964- present)
 Married to Teresa Vasques Milhinhos, Viscondessa de Miranda de Corvo with whom he has two children.
 Heir to D. Pedro Miguel Vasques Milhinhos (1996- present)

Arronches
1674 establishments in Portugal